Elamba-Mudakkal  is a village in Thiruvananthapuram district in the state of Kerala, India.

Demographics
 India census, Elamba-Mudakkal had a population of 20862 with 9735 males and 11127 females.

References

Villages in Thiruvananthapuram district